Ricky Mavuba Mafuila Ku Mbundu (15 December 1949 – 30 November 1996) was a football player from Zaïre, nicknamed The Black Sorcerer. His son is Rio Mavuba, who was a French international footballer.

Biography 
Born in Léopoldville, He competed for Zaire at the 1974 FIFA World Cup 
in Germany and also won the 1974 African Cup of Nations in Egypt defeating Zambia in a second game by 2–0.

Mavuba is remembered for taking direct free kicks and penalty kick executions. He is credited with being the first Congolese footballer ever to score from a corner kick: a curved shot that went in straight in the back of the net without deflections.

Following his football career, Mavuba moved to Angola. He fled the country with his family at the onset of the civil war in 1984 and lived as a refugee in France until his death in November 1996.

Club career 
Defensive midfield player from Zaïre, 
winger from AS Vita Club of Kinshasa which won the CAF Champions League in 1973.

Honours 

 Africa Cup of Nations: Champions in 1974

References

See also
1974 FIFA World Cup squads

1949 births
1996 deaths
Footballers from Kinshasa
Africa Cup of Nations-winning players
Democratic Republic of the Congo footballers
Democratic Republic of the Congo international footballers
1974 FIFA World Cup players
1974 African Cup of Nations players
AS Vita Club players
Democratic Republic of the Congo emigrants to France
Association football forwards